Elections to Strabane District Council were held on 15 May 1985 on the same day as the other Northern Irish local government elections. The election used three district electoral areas to elect a total of 15 councillors.

Election results

Note: "Votes" are the first preference votes.

Districts summary

|- class="unsortable" align="centre"
!rowspan=2 align="left"|Ward
! % 
!Cllrs
! % 
!Cllrs
! %
!Cllrs
! %
!Cllrs
! % 
!Cllrs
!rowspan=2|TotalCllrs
|- class="unsortable" align="center"
!colspan=2 bgcolor="" | DUP
!colspan=2 bgcolor="" | Sinn Féin
!colspan=2 bgcolor="" | SDLP
!colspan=2 bgcolor="" | UUP
!colspan=2 bgcolor="white"| Others
|-
|align="left"|Derg
|bgcolor="#D46A4C"|33.2
|bgcolor="#D46A4C"|2
|26.2
|1
|9.2
|0
|23.2
|1
|8.2
|1
|5
|-
|align="left"|Glenelly
|bgcolor="#D46A4C"|35.2
|bgcolor="#D46A4C"|2
|13.2
|1
|17.9
|1
|23.5
|1
|10.2
|0
|5
|-
|align="left"|Mourne
|9.3
|0
|27.9
|1
|bgcolor="#99FF66"|30.6
|bgcolor="#99FF66"|2
|10.1
|1
|22.1
|1
|5
|-
|- class="unsortable" class="sortbottom" style="background:#C9C9C9"
|align="left"| Total
|26.1
|4
|22.3
|3
|19.1
|3
|19.1
|3
|13.4
|2
|15
|-
|}

District results

Derg

1985: 2 x DUP, 1 x Sinn Féin, 1 x UUP, 1 x Independent Nationalist

Glenelly

1985: 2 x DUP, 1 x UUP, 1 x SDLP, 1 x Sinn Féin

Mourne

1985: 2 x SDLP, 1 x Sinn Féin, 1 x UUP, 1 x Independent Nationalist

References

Strabane District Council elections
Strabane